Saiful Islam is a Bangladeshi film editor. He won the Bangladesh National Film Award for Best Editing twice for the film Traas (1992) and Ghani (2006).

Selected films

Awards and nominations
National Film Awards

References

External links

Living people
Year of birth missing (living people)
Bangladeshi film editors
Best Editor National Film Award (Bangladesh) winners